Waqrawiri (Quechua waqra horn, wiri lasso, "horn lasso", Hispanicized spelling Huajrahuire) or Waxra Wiri (Aymara waxra horn, wiri (a part of) a foot plough) is a mountain in the Wansu mountain range in the Andes of Peru, about  high. It is situated in the Arequipa Region, Castilla Province, Orcopampa District. Waqrawiri lies northwest of the lake Machuqucha and south of the river Millumayu (Quechua for aluminium sulfate river,<ref>Hispanicized Millomayo).

References 

Mountains of Peru
Mountains of Arequipa Region